The R340 is a Regional Route in South Africa that connects the N2 at Keurboomsrivier near Plettenberg Bay in the south-east with the R339 (heading to Uniondale and the R62).

External links
 Routes Travel Info

References

Regional Routes in the Western Cape